Wipe Out is a Dot Records album credited to The Surfaris, released in 1963. It contains their best known song "Wipe Out". It turned out that only two tracks, "Wipe Out" and "Surfer Joe" were actually played by The Surfaris, therefore repressings were titled  Wipe Out and Surfer Joe and Other Popular Selections by Other Instrumental Groups. Those other instrumental groups were never named. The Surfaris were signed to Decca Records, and their first album on that label was called Play (Decca DL 4470).

Dot released a single from this album in July 1965: "You Can't Sit Down", backed with "Surfer Joe", catalog number Dot 16757.

Background 
The album features cover versions of rock standards, minus the two originals, "Wipe Out" and "Surfer Joe". "Wipe Out" was written by all members of the band, whilst "Surfer Joe" was penned by drummer Ron Wilson.

Track listing

Personnel 
(on "Wipe Out" and "Surfer Joe")
 Rhythm guitar: Bob Berryhill
 Lead guitar: Jim Fuller
 Bass: Pat Connolly
 Drums: Ron Wilson
 Saxophone: Jim Pash

Production credits
 Producer: Richard Delvy
 Associate Producer: John Marascalco
 Arranged by Glenn Grey (guitarist of The Challengers)

References

1963 albums
The Surfaris albums
Dot Records albums